Ancylolomia dives, the Fulvous grass-moth is a moth in the family Crambidae. It was described by George Hampson in 1919. It is found in India.

References

Ancylolomia
Moths described in 1919
Moths of Asia